Amanita gayana or Gay's death cap is a species of Amanita from Chile.

References

External links
 
 

gayana